Frederick William Benteen (August 24, 1834 – June 22, 1898) was a military officer who first fought during the American Civil War. He was appointed to commanding ranks during the Indian Campaigns and Great Sioux War against the Lakota and Northern Cheyenne. Benteen is best known for being in command of a battalion (Companies D, H,& K) of the 7th U. S. Cavalry at the Battle of the Little Bighorn in late June, 1876.

After scouting the area of the left flank as ordered, Captain Benteen received a note from his superior officer George Armstrong Custer ordering him to quickly bring up the ammunition packs and join him in Custer's surprise attack on a large Native American encampment. Benteen's failure to promptly comply with Custer's orders is one of the most controversial aspects of the famed battle. The fight resulted in the death of Custer and the complete annihilation of the five companies of cavalrymen which comprised Custer's detachment, but Benteen's relief of Major Marcus Reno's battalion may have saved them from annihilation.

Benteen subsequently served in the U.S. Cavalry another 12 years, being both honored by promotion and disgraced with a conviction for drunkenness by a military tribunal. He retired for health reasons in 1888, and lived a further decade until his death from natural causes at age 63.

Early life and career
Frederick Benteen was born August 24, 1834, in Petersburg, Virginia to Theodore Charles Benteen and his wife Caroline (Hargrove) Benteen. Benteen's paternal ancestors had emigrated to America from the Netherlands in the 18th century, settling in Baltimore, Maryland. Theodore and Caroline moved their family to Virginia from Baltimore shortly after the birth of their first child, Henrietta Elizabeth, in October 1831. Frederick Benteen was educated at the Petersburg Classical Institute, where he was first trained in military drill. His family moved to St. Louis, Missouri in 1849.

The election of Abraham Lincoln as U.S. President in 1860 polarized the country and the state. While a slave state, Missouri had many Union sympathizers and active abolitionists. Theodore Charles Benteen, an ardent secessionist, vehemently opposed his son's associating with Unionists. A family crisis was ignited when Frederick joined the Union Army on September 1, 1861 as a first lieutenant in the 1st Missouri Volunteer Cavalry Regiment. (Len Eagleburger's book places Benteen at the Battle of Wilson's Creek in August 1861.)  The 1st Missouri Volunteer Cavalry was often referred to as "Bowen's Battalion."  It was later redesignated as the 9th and then merged into the 10th Missouri Cavalry.

Benteen participated in numerous battles during the American Civil War, for which he was awarded the brevet ranks of major and then lieutenant colonel. Among his engagements were the battles of Wilson's Creek, Pea Ridge, Vicksburg, and Westport. On February 27, 1864, Benteen was promoted to lieutenant colonel and commander of the 10th Missouri Cavalry. Benteen was mustered out at the war's end on June 30, 1865.

Shortly thereafter he was appointed to the rank of colonel as commander of the 138th Regiment Infantry U.S. Colored Troops. He led the regiment from July 1865 to January 6, 1866, when it was mustered out. Later that year, he was appointed a captain in the 7th U.S. Cavalry. Meanwhile, the Senate finally approved awards of brevet ranks to distinguished veterans of the Civil War. Benteen received brevets of major for the Battle of Mine Creek and lieutenant colonel for the Battle of Columbus (1865).

7th Cavalry service under Custer

In January 1867, Benteen departed for his new assignment with the 7th US Cavalry Regiment and its field commander Lt. Col. George Armstrong Custer. He was assigned to this regiment for 16 years, through many of the Indian Wars. Until 1882, except for periods of leave and detached duty, Benteen commanded H Troop of the 7th US Cavalry.

On January 30, 1867, Benteen made a customary courtesy call to the quarters of Custer and his wife Elizabeth. Benteen said later that he regarded Custer as a braggart from their first meeting (and his dislike deepened throughout his years of service under the man).
Meanwhile, on March 27, 1867, Benteen's wife gave birth to their son in Atlanta.

Following the Civil War, the Cheyenne Indians represented the greatest threat on the Kansas frontier. In late July 1868, Benteen led an expedition to provide security for the Indian agents near Fort Larned. On August 13, Benteen, commanding 30 troopers, encountered a Cheyenne raiding party along the banks of Elk Horn Creek near Fort Zarah. He charged into a force of what appeared to be about fifty warriors. To Benteen's surprise, he next  discovered more than 200 Cheyenne raiding a ranch. Benteen pursued the Cheyenne without rest until dark, engaging them throughout the day without respite. This first undisputed victory of the 7th US Cavalry brought Benteen a brevet to colonel and the adoration of the settlers of central Kansas.

On October 13, Benteen and his men were assigned to escort a wagon train loaded with weapons and ammunition meant for the regiment. They reached the wagon train just as a war party began to attack. Benteen drove off the warriors, saving the wagon train from capture. Later following the trail of the raiding party, the 7th US Cavalry came upon a Cheyenne encampment on the Washita River in the Indian Territory.

In response to the continued Cheyenne raids, General Philip Sheridan devised a plan of punitive reprisals. His troops would respond to Indian attacks by entering their winter encampments, destroying supplies and livestock, and killing those who resisted. The cavalry was directed to travel in the dead of winter through a largely uncharted region, which required daring leadership. Sheridan turned to Lt. Col. George Armstrong Custer, who was brought back early from his court-martial and given the mission. Sheridan trusted only Custer with such a deed, and in November 1868 Custer returned to his regiment under special orders from Sheridan.

On November 23, 1868, Custer left Camp Supply with the 11 companies of the 7th US Cavalry, heading toward the Washita River. On November 27, the 7th surrounded a Cheyenne encampment at the river. Just before dawn, Custer launched a four-pronged assault on the village, known as the Battle of Washita River.

As captain of H Troop, Benteen led a squadron of Major Joel Elliott's command during the attack. His horse was shot from under him by a son of Cheyenne Chief Black Kettle. The boy was about fourteen years old and was armed only with a revolver. Benteen yelled he would spare the boy's life if he dropped the revolver, and made the peace sign. In reply, the boy aimed his revolver at Benteen and fired. The bullet missed, so the boy fired again, and the bullet passed through the sleeve of Benteen's coat. The boy fired a third time, although Benteen was making friendly overtures. This bullet hit Benteen's horse, killing it, and pitching Benteen into the snow. When the Indian boy raised his pistol to fire once more, Benteen finally shot him dead.

Custer, in his battle report to Sheridan, made little reference to US casualties. During the action itself, the 7th lost only one man killed (Captain Hamilton) and seven wounded. However, shortly after the battle, Major Elliott and 19 men had pursued escaping warriors up the river and had yet to return: as such they were posted as missing. It later emerged that Elliott (who rode off with the cry "Here's for a brevet or a coffin!") had been surrounded and killed by the Cheyenne, along with all his men.

Benteen concluded that Custer had abandoned Elliott and wrote to a friend criticizing the senior officer over this. The letter was passed to the St. Louis Democrat newspaper and published without Benteen's permission or name. On its publication Custer called the officers together and threatened to 'horsewhip' the author. Without revealing that the letter had been published without his knowledge or permission, Benteen admitted authorship, albeit with a hand on his pistol. Custer did not attempt a whipping but dismissed the matter with a curt "Mister Benteen, I will see you later".

Little Bighorn
Captain Benteen still commanded H Troop of the Seventh US Cavalry regiment during an 1876 expedition to find the Lakota and Cheyenne and force them onto reservations. On June 25, 1876, still searching approximately 12 miles from the Little Bighorn River, Custer divided his force into three battalions. He assigned Benteen command of a battalion comprising Troops D, H and K, tasked with searching on the left flank and securing any possible escape route. Benteen searched fruitlessly through rough ground for about two hours before returning to the trail of the main column. At a marshy crossing of Reno Creek ("the morass"), he stopped twenty minutes to water the horses. Some of his officers were concerned with the delay; one asked, "I wonder what the old man is keeping us here for." Just before leaving, they heard the sound of gunfire in the distance. Captain Thomas Weir was already mounted at the head of the column. Pointing ahead, he said of Custer's companies, "They ought to be over there," and started his company forward. Benteen ordered the rest of the battalion to advance.

As they approached the Little Bighorn River, Benteen was met by a messenger from Custer, soon followed by another, both saying that a big village had been found and that Benteen should immediately come up. A note delivered to him read: "Come on. Big village. Be quick. Bring packs." The slow pack mules, carrying reserve ammunition and guarded by B Troop, had reached the marsh and were slaking their thirst. After first waiting for the pack train, Benteen decided to move on without them.

Benteen has been criticized by some military analysts because he failed to obey (Custer's) instructions. He received the note, he read it, he thought enough of it to tuck it in a pocket, but he did not get the ammunition packs and rush forward to Custer's aid. Instead, as he approached the battleground after his scouting trip he saw Major Reno's demoralized men attempting to organize a defensive position on the bluff and he chose to join them. This decision assured Custer's death. It would seem, therefore, that Benteen must be condemned; yet if he had tried to carry out the order it is possible his three companies would have been hacked to pieces en route. Then Reno's weakened command surely would have collapsed, and when General Terry arrived he would count every single man of the Seventh Cavalry dead.

Benteen explained to the 1879 Court of Inquiry why he did what he did, and his reasoning is equally clear from subsequent remarks. He thought it impossible to obey; to do so would have been suicide. "We were at their hearths and homes," he said, referring to the Sioux, "their medicine was working well, and they were fighting for all the good God gives anyone to fight for."

— Evan S. Connell in Son of the Morning Star

Meanwhile, the battalion made up of Troops A, G and M, and led by Major Marcus Reno had attacked the southwest corner of the large village, farther down the Little Bighorn River, and had been routed with heavy casualties. The tattered remains of the battalion struggled to cross the river and climb the bluffs, pursued by many warriors. Benteen met up with the remnants of the battalion on Reno Hill, and Reno called out "For God's sake Benteen! Halt your command and help me! I've lost half my men!"

Shortly afterward, they were surprised that the pursuing warriors began to turn away from them and head north. Three miles back, Captain Thomas McDougall, marching with the pack train, heard gunfire, "a dull sound that resounded through the hills". The troops with Benteen and Reno -- even Lieutenant Edward Settle Godfrey, who was deaf in one ear -- also heard it. Both Reno and Benteen claimed they never heard it. Further, they did not at once advance to find out, which would later give rise to charges that they had abandoned Custer.

After a delay of at least half an hour waiting for orders, Captain Weir rode north about a mile toward the sound of gunfire to the present-day Weir Point, followed by his company. There they could see a cloud of dust and smoke some three miles farther north. They assumed it was Custer. As they watched, however, they saw warriors emerging from the smoke, heading toward them, "thick as grasshoppers in a harvest field." 

Just then, Benteen arrived. Looking at the situation, he realized this was "a hell of a place to fight Indians." He decided they must retreat to their original position, now called the "Reno-Benteen defense site". Here Benteen quickly established a horseshoe-shaped defensive perimeter on the bluffs near where he and Reno had met earlier. They were attacked immediately and throughout the rest of the day.

As night fell, the attack slackened off, while the large Lakota village was alive with celebration. About 2:30 a.m., two rifle shots signaled a resumption of the attack. Whatever his reluctance earlier, Benteen took charge of the force, leading at least one, perhaps three, charges which drove the Indians back just as it seemed the soldiers would be overrun. Cool and calm (at one point he lay down for a nap), Benteen walked among his troops encouraging them. When his men urged him to get down, he replied that he was protected by some charm his wife had sewn in his uniform. He was wounded in the thumb, and the heel was shot off one of his boots.

Attacks on the soldiers dwindled by the afternoon of June 26. By 4:00 p.m., gunfire had stopped altogether. By 5:00 p.m., thick smoke obscured the village. The smoke cleared by sunset, revealing the entire village moving away "two to three and a half miles long and from half a mile to a mile wide ... as if someone was moving a heavy carpet over the ground." moving south. Overnight, Army stragglers from Reno's battalion, given up for dead, wandered in. Finally, during the morning of June 27, the survivors could see a cloud of dust downriver. It turned out to be Generals Alfred Terry and John Gibbon. The standoff was over.

When General Terry and his staff reached him, Benteen asked if he knew "where Custer had gone." Terry answered, "To the best of my knowledge and belief, he lies on this ridge about four miles below here with all his command killed." Benteen could not believe it. Later they rode to the battlefield, where Benteen identified Custer's body. "By God, he said, "that is him."

In the aftermath of the battle, Benteen's decision to remain with Reno, rather than continuing on at once to seek Custer, was much criticized. One veteran of the battle said decades later:

Later military activities
Benteen participated in the Nez Perce campaign in 1877. He was brevetted brigadier general on February 27, 1890 for his actions in that campaign at the Battle of Canyon Creek, as well as for his earlier actions at the Little Bighorn. He testified at the Reno Court of Inquiry in 1879 in Chicago.

Benteen was promoted to major, 9th U.S. Cavalry, in December 1882. In 1887, he was suspended for drunk and disorderly conduct at Fort Duchesne, Utah. He was convicted and faced dismissal from the Army, but President Grover Cleveland reduced his sentence to a one-year suspension. Benteen retired on July 7, 1888, citing disability from rheumatism and heart disease.

Family
While stationed in eastern Missouri in 1856, Benteen became acquainted with Catharine "Kate" Louisa Norman, a young woman recently arrived in St. Louis from Philadelphia. They were married on January 7, 1862 at St. George's Church in St. Louis. He and Catherine had five children, four of whom died in infancy:
Caroline Elizabeth, born in July 1863 at St. Louis; died before her first birthday; Katherine Norman, born in December 1868 at Fort Harker, Kansas; died a year later; Francis "Fannie" Gibson Norman, born in April 1872 at Nashville, Tennessee; died at eight months; Theodore Norman, born April 1875 at Fort Rice, North Dakota; died that winter. Their fourth child, Frederick Wilson, born March 27, 1873 at Atlanta, Georgia, survived, living until  July 20, 1956. Like his father, he pursued a military career, rising to Lt. Colonel.

Death and legacy
Benteen died in Atlanta, Georgia on June 22, 1898, leaving his widow Kate and son Frederick. He was buried in Westview Cemetery in Atlanta; his pallbearers included Georgia Governor William Y. Atkinson and Atlanta mayor Charles A. Collier. Benteen's remains were later re-interred at Arlington National Cemetery.

Benteen Elementary School in Atlanta, Georgia is named for Frederick Benteen's son, Frederick Wilson Benteen, who grew up there and had a military career.

References

Further reading
 Evans, D. C. Custer's Last Fight, Volume I, Battle of Little Big Horn. El Segundo, CA: Upton and Sons, 1999
 Graham, W. W. The Custer Myth, Lincoln NE: University of Nebraska Press, 1986
 Hammer, Kenneth, edited by Ronald H. Nichols, Men with Custer: Biographies of the 7th Cavalry June 25, 1876, Hardin, MT: Custer Battlefield Historical and Museum Association, 2000.
 Mills, Charles K., Harvest of Barren Regrets: The Army Career of Frederick William Benteen, 1834–1898, Glendale, CA: Arthur H. Clark Co., 1985. 
 Eagleburger, Len. The Fighting 10th: The History of the 10th Missouri Cavalry US (Bloomington, IN: 1stBooks), 2004.

External links
 Frederick Benteen: Oath of Office as Captain in the 7th Cavalry, 1866, Shapell Manuscript Foundation
 Complete transcript of the Reno Court of Inquiry
 

1834 births
1898 deaths
People from Petersburg, Virginia
American people of Dutch descent
Union Army colonels
People of the Great Sioux War of 1876
People of Missouri in the American Civil War
Burials at Arlington National Cemetery
Battle of the Little Bighorn
United States Army officers
Southern Unionists in the American Civil War